Alexis may refer to:

People

Mononym
 Alexis (poet) ( – ), a Greek comic poet

 Alexis (sculptor), an ancient Greek artist who lived around the 3rd or 4th century BC
 Alexis (singer) (born 1968), German pop singer
 Alexis (comics) (1946–1977), French comics artist
 Alexis, character in Virgil's Eclogue II, beloved of Corydon (character)
 Alexis, in Greek mythology, a young man of Ephesus, beloved of Meliboea
 Alexis, a fictional character from Transformers:Unicron Trilogy

Given name
 Alexis (given name)

Surname
Aaron Alexis (1979–2013), perpetrator of the 2013 Washington Navy Yard shooting
Kim Alexis (born 1960), American supermodel
Jacques-Édouard Alexis (born 1947), former prime minister of Haiti
Jacques Stephen Alexis (1922–1961), Haitian communist novelist, poet, and activist
Paul Alexis (1847–1901), French novelist, dramatist, and journalist
Stephen Alexis (1889–1962), Haitian novelist and diplomat
Wendell Alexis (born 1964), American basketball player
Willibald Alexis or Georg Wilhelm Heinrich Häring (1798–1871), German novelist

Places
Alexis, Alabama, U.S., an unincorporated community 
Alexis, Illinois, U.S., a village
Alexis Lake, a lake in Minnesota, U.S.
Alexis Township, Butler County, Nebraska, U.S.

Other uses
ALEXIS, the Array of Low Energy X-ray Imaging Sensors spacecraft
Alexis (malting barley), a malting barley variety

See also
Alexia (disambiguation)
Alexius, a given name
Aleksejs, a given name
Alexisonfire, a Canadian band
 Alexus, a given name and surname
 Saint-Alexis (disambiguation)

pt:Alexis